Semi.Official is an American hip hop group from Minnesota. It consists of I Self Devine and DJ Abilities. The duo released the debut album, The Anti-Album, on Rhymesayers Entertainment in 2003. In 2011, Complex listed the track, "Grey", as one of the 25 Best Rhymesayers Songs.

Discography

Albums
 The Anti-Album (2003)

Singles
 "Crime" (2003)

References

External links
  on Rhymesayers Entertainment
 

Alternative hip hop groups
American hip hop groups
American musical duos
Rhymesayers Entertainment artists